This is a list of  characters.

Nascita
Several characters gather at Nascita, a café owned by Sōichi Isurugi where he lives with his daughter Misora.

Sento Kiryu
 is the main protagonist of the series. He is a genius physicist who has amnesia, with his only memory being Night Rogue performing experiments on him. He was found by Sōichi Isurugi and was offered shelter at Nascita.

Ryuga Banjo
 is a 23-year-old former professional fighter born in Yokohama. Prior to his birth, a portion of Evolto's essence, fused with the unborn Ryuga in a failed attempt to possess his mother . As a result, Ryuga was born after only two months of gestation, and spent much of his childhood being tested by Namba Industries. When Takumi Katsuragi learned of Ryuga's true nature, Takumi attempted to lure him into his apartment an kill him and Evolto, but the plan backfired when Evolto erased Takumi's memories and killed Taro Sato, with Ruga being framed for the murder.

He later escaped from prison, and was taken in by Sento Kiryu. His girlfriend was turned into a Smash and killed in front of him, with the resulting essence purified into the Dragon Fullbottle, which was given to Ryuga. He was later given a copy of the Build Driver and became  using the Cross-Z Dragon and Dragon Fullbottle.

Unlike Kamen Rider Build, Kamen Rider Cross-Z cannot mix and match Fullbottles as the Cross-Z Dragon only has one slot, but is physically stronger. He later gains the  belt and a Dragon  stand-up pouch to become .

Misora Isurugi
 is Sōichi's 19-year-old daughter who works as Sento's assistant in purifying Fullbottles. She gained her powers after being exposed to the Pandora Box and spending seven years in a coma. She played a role in Project Build, as Evolto used Sōichi's memories of her drawings of organic and inorganic-based objects to influence Shinobu in developing the Best Match system. She was kidnapped by Faust for experimentation, but Sōichi rescued her a year prior to the series. She remained hidden in Nascita while using her online idol identity  to gather intel and occasionally money from her fanbase.

Misora possesses the ability to purify and enhance Nebula Gas which made her a target of Faust. Initially, using the ability put her to sleep for a week; Sento later developed a machine to mitigate this. During the invasion by Seito, the western part of Japan, Misora's Martian bracelet is revealed to house the spirit of the Martian Vernage and the source of Misora's power.

Sawa Takigawa
 is a 27-year-old freelance journalist who assists Sento after learning his true identity as Kamen Rider Build. She was later revealed to be a spy for Namba Heavy Industries, using her position to investigate the cover-up of an industrial accident she believes killed her father. Sawa is later revealed to be a brainwashed Namba agent, her motivating drive about her father being a fabrication. She was supposed to let herself die after failing Namba's mission but the familial bonds she made with Sento and the others gave her a reason to live and influenced her decision to cut ties with Namba.

Sōichi Isurugi
 is the enigmatic 48-year-old owner of Nascita and Misora's father who is secretly Faust's high-ranking member. Ten years prior to the series, he was the astronaut who discovered the Evol Driver and the Pandora Box on Mars. This resulted in his possession by the alien entity Evolto who used him to commit numerous atrocities including the Skywall Disaster. Sōichi's personality occasionally resurfaces to briefly fight Evolto before being suppressed. Sōichi was tricked into thinking that Evolto would leave his body upon retrieving the Evol Driver and ended up in a coma while Evolto possessed Ryūga then Sento before creating his own body in Sōichi's image.

Sawatari Farm
 is the Sawatari family's potato farm in Hokuto, the northern region of Japan isolated by the Skywall Disaster.

Kazumi Sawatari
 is a 29-year-old soldier from Hokuto and the current owner of his farm. In hopes of obtaining more financial support, Kazumi volunteered for Hokuto's military and underwent Faust's human experimentation. Having first infiltrated Touto during the events of Kamen Rider Heisei Generations Final: Build & Ex-Aid with Legend Rider to reclaim the Phoenix and Robot Fullbottles for Hokuto, Kazumi is deployed to lead the Hokuto army to invade Touto. After Seito's invasion of Hokuto, he joined forces with those from Nascita in hopes of reclaiming his country.

Kazumi transforms into  with the Sclash Driver and Robot Sclashjelly. Despite being warned its usage will kill him, he used it to become , resulting in his death once the fight was over.

Hokuto Three Crows
The  are a trio of Hokuto soldiers who were originally workers of the Sawatari farm who enlisted to repay a debt to their former employer.

Akaba
He seems to possess a violent streak when he attacks civilians without hesitation, but is ultimately loyal to Kazumi, following his decisions even when he questions them. When Seito invaded Touto to steal the Pandora Box, Akaba sacrificed his life to protect it from Gentoku, but ultimately failed to prevent the theft.

Aoba
, real name , uses the  Fullbottle to transform into the stag beetle-themed . Despite his looks and mannerisms, Aoba is one of the kinder members of the Three Crows. He is unexpectedly killed during battle when Build goes on a rampage and uses the Hazard Finish against him.

Kiba
He behaves childishly, even acting literally like a child throwing a fit when defeated by Build in one battle. After Aoba's death, he becomes bitter and increasingly violent in combat. While trying to defend his homeland from Seito's invasion, Kiba becomes the Washio Brothers' hostage to force Kazumi into serving Seito. Kiba is killed protecting Kazumi.

Faust
 is a mysterious terrorist organization that experiment on humans to create the Smash creatures. It was founded by Touto scientists Takumi Katsuragi and Gentoku Himuro. According to Gentoku, Faust's objectives are to achieve Takumi's goals of evolving humanity into the "ultimate lifeform". The organization was compromised by Evolto and Namba who sought to reassemble the Pandora Box and repeat the calamity that destroyed the ancient Martian civilization.

Gentoku Himuro
 is the 35-year-old special advisor to his father, Prime Minister Taizan Himuro, and head of the Touto Institute. His personality was altered after the Skywall Disaster into a sadistic and paranoid power-hungry maniac, who performed questionable acts for Touto's safety after deeming his father's pacifism a liability. Gentoku orchestrated Takumi Katsuragi's expulsion from Touto Institute to cover for the Devil's Scientist while unknowingly being manipulated by Sōichi Isurugi. After taking his late friend's position as the prime minister's advisor, Gentoku took the mantle of Night Rogue and declared his leadership over Faust.

After his identity is exposed, he went into exile and sought refuge with Namba Industries, becoming  using the Sclash Driver and  Fullbottle.

Evolto
 is the true antagonist of the series and leader of both the Blood Tribe and Faust. A genocidal sociopath, prior to the series, Evolto has taken the Pandora Box away and escaped from his brother, Killbus who was using Pandora Box to destroy his home planet. After the destruction of his planet, he used the power of the Pandora Box to destroy planets to absorb their energies as a means of gaining power and travelling. Until he destroyed the Martian civilization, he was rendered incorporeal and lost his true physical form before Vernage sealed him alongside his damaged Evol-Trigger within the Pandora Box.

When a Mars rover arrived for observation, Evolto used it to send a piece of himself to Earth to acquire a host to restore himself. But it backfired when the fragment's attempt of possessing Namba Industries security guard Yuri Banjo resulted in it being assimilated into her unborn child Ryuga. 13 years later, Evolto possessed the astronaut Sōichi Isurugi when he retrieved the Pandora Box from Mars and attempted to destroy Earth, only for Vernage's intervention to result in the Skywall Incident to scatter the Pandora Box across Japan. This forces Evolto to execute a decade-long plan of manipulating various individuals and events, such as the foundation of Faust, positioning himself within Namba Heavy Industries and grooming Ryuga as his next vessel. Evolto also used Sōichi's connections to force Shinobu and his son into working for him, tricking a young Misora to purify Fullbottles, and framed Ryūga for Tarō's death while an unconscious Katsuragi was spirited away with his memory and face altered. With Katsuragi's new identity as "Sento Kiryu", Evolto further manipulated him into perfecting the Build System and created other Rider Systems that Katsuragi purposely scrapped. In the hopes of hiding his presence, he made his original voice the default setting of Blood Stalk's system during transformation.

After all Fullbottles were purified, Evolto exposed his treachery to the crews of Nascita and his plans to use the Pandora Box to destroy Earth's civilizations, exploiting Namba as they engineered a series of schemes to take over Japan with only Touto and its Kamen Riders as their opposition. After regaining the Evol-Driver, Evolto abandoned his host to become  as he transferred himself to Ryūga's body to regain his full power and then into Sento to use his intelligence to repair the Evol-Trigger. Once the Evol-Trigger was repaired, Evolto left Sento's body and became a corporeal shapeshifter, assuming Sōichi's appearance. Evolto then proceeded to kill Namba who refused to accept being a puppet ruler while winning the maddened Utsumi to his cause. Evolto decided to take over Earth instead of destroying it after finding amusement in Namba's final moments and Utsumi's descent into insanity. Initially limited to feeling either delight or irritation, Evolto developed human emotions as a result of his Hazard Level increasing. Evolto also assumed Midō's identity to place the Blood Tribe as governors to execute Build Annihilation Plan, but a mutiny by Inō forced him into an alliance with his own adversaries.

When later defeated by the four Kamen Riders using a coordinated attack, Evolto imparts a fragment of himself within Utsumi to reconstitute himself. He then absorbs the panel to assume his true monstrous form, but was forced back to his Rider Form by the four Kamen Riders and loses a Lost Fullbottle as well, though he escapes. Combined with his inability to emotionally compose himself, Evolto became very disappointed by the defeat and falls back to his original plan of destroying all life on Earth. As the final battle between Evolto and the Riders began, he succeeds in causing Kazumi's death and kills Utsumi after the latter reveals his true allegiance. Evolto becomes omnipotent but Gentoku wounds him enough for Ryūga to sacrifice himself to trap Evolto in the vortex of a wormhole created by the complete Pandora Box. 

Evolto attempts to cheat death by absorbing Ryuga but Sento saves his friend, with Evolto seemingly erased as a side-effect of Pandora Box merging their universe with the prime Kamen Rider universe. However, Evolto reconstitutes himself through a fragment of himself that slipped into Ryuga. When Killbus reappears again in the new world and threatens to destroy the entire universe, Evolto gracefully joins forces with Ryūga to defeat Killbus before leaving Earth to regain his full strength and body.

A cruel, fierce, and ruthless character, Evolto committed several heinous acts using Sōichi's body as a vessel, killing without hesitation and on one occasion turned a child into a Smash, with his plots and actions resulting in several deaths. Evolto is a very patient manipulator, having spent years establishing his plans while winning allies or placing enemies in situations that play to his advantage, but can be taken off guard by unexpected occurrences where he was forced to improvise. Due to the successful nature of his plots in the first half of the series, Evolto becomes arrogant and overconfident, but his reliance on luck backfired several times. It also extends to his tendency of toying with his opponents as he fails to expect a stronger counterattack, which proves costly when the Riders were able to force him out of his true form just moments after he had regained it. Another flaw Evolto suffered was his inability to handle human emotions as the result of having used multiple host bodies and his exposure to Build, making him prone to blind rage and later expressing fear when sucked into the wormhole and facing his impending doom. In the new world, while still resentful toward the Kamen Riders and humanity, Evolto admits to having developed a new-found respect for them as he mocked Killbus for underestimating humans right before the latter is finished off by Cross-Z Evol.

As a Rider, he possesses high-speed movements on par with any previous Kamen Riders, matched only by Build Genius Form. Each of his forms are treated as an evolution of his :
 is the primary form of Evol, a.k.a. .
, a.k.a. .
, a.k.a. .
 is Kamen Rider Evol's true form, a.k.a. .

While possessing Sōichi Isurugi and later assuming his likeness, he is played by Yasuyuki Maekawa.

Faust agents

Masahiro Nabeshima
 is a prison guard who frames Ryuga Banjo for the death of Touto Institute researcher Takumi Katsuragi, then delivers Ryūga to Faust for experimentation. After luring Sento and Ryuga to Seito, he was converted into Mirage Smash as a "reward" and later into Square Smash as part of Blood Stalk's experiment. Although rescued by Build and Ryuga, the experiments erased almost all of his memories. Sometime later, he regained his memories and revealed information about Faust to Sento, including Blood Stalk's identity. He and his family later are captured by Namba and used to force Sawa to betray her friends.

Eita Kawai
 is a researcher in the Touto Institute and one of Katsuragi's sympathizers. He uploaded data of Pandora Box before the Faust army stole it. A weakened Kawai was reverted to his human form by Stalk, who erased his memories and altered his face to look like Kuwata.

Shingo Kuwata
 is a Touto Institute researcher and a Katsuragi sympathizer. He uses his Fullbottle to become a version of the Flying Smash. After being defeated by Build, he reveals that he was meant to lure Build away from Faust's raid to steal the Pandora Box. Before committing suicide, he reveals that Takumi had been faking his death.

Guardians
The  are enforcement androids mass-produced by Namba Industries as peacekeepers of each country, though it is not initially known that they are supporting governments outside Touto. They also act as Faust sleeper agents awaiting activation by Blood Stalk.

A large number of them can combine together to form a single gigantic robot equipped with multiple guns. Under Faust's servitude, the reprogrammed Guardians can act as suicide bombers.

Smash
The  are monsters formed by humans injected with the liquefied  as part of Faust's experiments. The experimental subject loses almost all of their memories. To revert a Smash back to a normal human, the Kamen Riders must defeat them and extract their essence into an empty Fullbottle. Faust agents are given their own Fullbottles to transform into their Smash forms, which are equipped with a self-destruct function. Silver-colored Smash are stronger versions, achieved through exposure to Nebula Gas of higher Hazard Levels. The experiment's goal was to find a perfect candidate for the Build Driver, with the Smash transformations considered failures. Each victim is ranked by their tolerance of Nebula Gas called .

Clone Smash
The , unlike regular Smash, are created from pure Nebula Gas, and attack until destroyed. Being enhanced versions of the Press, Stretch, Strong and Flying Smash Hazard, the Clone Smash are stronger and more durable due to their inability to feel pain. The Clone Smash are later used as materials to power a Lost Fullbottle to enable its user's transformation into a Lost Smash.

Lost Smash
 are Smash breeds created by Evolto and Katsuragi as the final Smash evolution. The experiment includes a human victim being heavily dosed with Nebula Gas and transformed into the Lost Smash by absorbing a pair of nearby Clone Smash. Aside from heightened aggression and being easy to manipulate, they are also bound to die should they be defeated. The Genius Fullbottle of Kamen Rider Build has the ability to save these victims and remove traces of Nebula Gas.

Namba Heavy Industries
 is a company established by Jūzaburō Namba which provides financial support to Faust. Because of its pervasive influence, all three countries attempted to distance themselves from Namba, although the company has agents placed within the governments' infrastructures.

Jūzaburō Namba
 is the corrupt and war-mongering chairman of Namba. He initially collaborates with Faust and Evolto to acquire the Build system for military applications, but has a secret agenda to use the Pandora Box's energy to create weapons of mass destruction. He also brainwashed children to act as his agents, including Sawa Takigawa. A power-hungry man with a god complex, he will do anything to attain his goals. However, he is not completely cruel as he was shown to be close to Nariaki Utsumi in flashbacks.

His ultimate goal is to use the power of the Pandora Box to reform Japan, and eventually the entire world, under his rule and in his image. However, Evolto exploited him for its own agenda. Namba then requests aid from the Kamen Riders against Evolto, but they fail and Namba is killed by Evolto while begging for his life.

Namba Children
The  are scientists, soldiers and spies who were brainwashed by Jūzaburō Namba from an early age. They are positioned as sleeper agents within Touto, Hokuto and Seito to inform for Namba while acquiring whatever Namba needs.

Nariaki Utsumi
 is the 28-year-old secretary of Himuro who was formally a Touto Institute scientist. Despite his commitment to Faust, Gentoku and Namba Heavy Industries, Utsumi expresses regret over his life choices, even commenting to Sento about their similar predicaments. To conceal Faust's activities, Utsumi became a scapegoat by masquerading as Night Rogue. His attempted suicide is stopped by Sento, but Utsumi is gravely injured and converted into a cyborg by Evolto. Utsumi then returned to Namba as his spokesperson and developed the Rider Systems for Hokuto and Seito, gathering data on the Hazard Trigger while perfecting the Kaiser System. Although he seemed to become more open-minded, Utsumi was actually a callous sadist and completely loyal to Namba.

After Evolto turns on Namba and killed him, Utsumi faked losing his sanity and was recruited as Evolto's enforcer, Kamen Rider Mad Rogue, briefly serving as a host to a fragment of the alien's body. But as Evolto neared his end goal, Utsumi reveals his deception and allies himself with Gentoku to avenge Namba while destroying Evolto's replicas of the Washio Brothers. Though his cybernetics burn out as Evolto defeats him, Utsumi sacrifices himself to shield Gentoku and Sawa from the alien's attack.

After the worlds are merged at the end of the series, an alternate Utsumi is shown working in Namba's metalwork factory. In Build New World: Kamen Rider Cross-Z, when Killbus restored the Pandora Box, Utsumi's lack of Nebula Gas administration prevented him from regaining the memories of his alternate self. But despite that, in Build New World: Kamen Rider Grease he recovers the memories of his alternate self along with his powers of Kamen Rider through the injection of Nebula Gas, assisting the other Riders in their battle against Down Fall.

Utsumi twice became Night Rogue as a decoy. His modification on Night Rogue grants him the ability to analyze his opponent through his visor.

Compared to the Build Driver, the Evol-Driver's  scrambles both elements of Fullbottles into a symmetrical form and his is specially tuned for human use. As Utsumi was planning to betray Evolto from the beginning, his Evol-Driver was modified to imitate Evolto's Phase evolution but the full power was too much for his cybernetics to handle. In a similar vein to Evolto, Mad Rogue also possesses a Rider Evol-Bottle, allowing him to manifest the power of a single Fullbottle.

Masuzawa
 is a spy who works as secretary to the Touto prime minister. When he is exposed by Sento, he kills himself using a Fullbottle to avoid capture. He is responsible for slipping a listening device into the Dragon Fullbottle to spy on Sento.

Washio Brothers
The  are a pair of siblings from Seito who serve alongside Gentoku as Seito's main troopers. The indoctrination and training they received transform them into sadistic soldiers who use deception and dirty tricks to accomplish their tasks. They transform using the Kaiser System developed by Kaisei Mogami and Nariaki Utsumi, with a shared Nebula Steam Gun. Because of their limited supply in weaponry, the Nebula Steam Rifle can only be held by one of them while the other engages in hand-to-hand combat.

After Evolto declared war against Namba Heavy Industries, the Washio Brothers form an uneasy alliance with the Riders before losing their lives. Evolto created his own copy of the Washio Brothers' Kaiser forms as guardians at the Pandora Tower. Utsumi revealed that he had sabotaged the Kaiser Systems and programmed both Same and Bike Fullbottles as countermeasures, used by Rogue and Mad Rogue to destroy the copies.

He is the dominant user of the Nebula Steam Gun. He can use his Gear Remocon with Rai's Gear Engine to transform into , an upgraded version of Bi-Kaiser. Despite being the more level-headed of the two, he occasionally shows annoyance and fury. Fū sacrificed himself to shield Cross-Z from a deathblow.
As Remocon is the primary user of the Nebula Steam Gun, Engine uses the Steam Blade as his main weapon. Engine Bros is the most vulnerable of the pair and can be weakened with water-based attacks. Rai is short-tempered, careless and more violent in combat. During an alliance with the Riders against Evolto, Rai was the first to be killed and was caught in their former companion's black hole, giving his Gear Engine to Fū before his death.

Hard Guardians
The  are enhanced versions of the Guardians which Namba Heavy Industries mass-produced following Seito's war declaration on Touto. When Namba Heavy was disbanded, the remaining units were under control of Evolto and served as the front line of Pandora Tower's defense.

The Hard Guardians are equipped with a combat AI unit, right arm-mounted Gatling guns, left arm-mounted clawed gauntlets, and shoulder-mounted missile pods. An improved drive module was placed on each joint to provide enhanced mobility. Their equipment can be replaced depending on the combat situation and can fight on equal terms against Rider Systems users.

Katsuragi family

Takumi Katsuragi
During the Sky Disaster, unaware of the full truth at the time, Takumi promised his father Shinobu that he would stop the Blood Race from destroying the Earth and restarted  where he subjected himself to Nebula Gas to become Kamen Rider Build, only to be banned for conducting unethical human experimentations with the Nebula Gas to evolve humanity.

During this period, Takumi assisted his former Touto colleague Kaisei Mogami in building the Enigma system to travel to another reality. While testing the performance of Kamen Rider Build in said world, he twice intervened in the confrontation between humans and Bugster. Having accidentally killed Kamen Rider Genm prior, Build went on to extract Ex-Aid's samples into a single Fullbottle before foiling Mogami's intent to cause a convergence between the two realities and stopped him.

Sometime after developing both Rider and Transteam Systems, Takumi learned that Faust had been compromised by Evolto. He halted the development of the Sclash Driver system and attempted to kill Evolto but was outsmarted. His memories and appearance were changed to Sento, and he was manipulated into completing the Rider System.

Takumi regained his memories when Evolto regained his perfect form, and becomes Build again but refuses to work with the others. When the Genius Fullbottle refused to cooperate, he was visited by Sento's consciousness and allowed this alter-ego to access Genius Form for the first time. From that point onward, Takumi served as a spiritual adviser to Sento despite his sense of pessimism.

Following the worlds' convergence, as revealed in Build New World: Kamen Rider Grease, Takumi exists as a separate being from Sento in their new universe and works despite being plagued by unpleasant memories of the old world. Alongside Sento, he creates a special serum that enables the Rider System users to recover the ability to transform and to be immune to the Phantom Crushers' special ability.

As the true creator of Build's Rider System, Takumi can use the basic Best Match forms. As he was absent while Sento further developed Build, Takumi had to retool it to keep up with its performance.

Shinobu Katsuragi
 is the father of Takumi Katsuragi and a member of the Kiwami Project which saw Sōichi Isurugi come into contact with the Pandora Box. Shinobu conducted illegal research on an infant Ryuga. Later, Shinobu led the conference of the Pandora Box's discovery when Evolto caused the Skywall Disaster, and his reputation was ruined as he was used as a scapegoat. Shinobu faked his suicide soon after cryptically informing Takumi that Ryuga is essential to stop Evolto and his kin, enlisting Reika Kine's aid in smuggling himself out of Touto.

Shinobu secretly aided Evolto for ten years by using his research in an attempt to repair the Evol-Driver before Takumi found and hid it. Shinobu resurfaces while Sento and his allies are searching for the Lost Fullbottles, revealing his alliance with Evolto while alienating Sento. However, Shinobu's plan was to eliminate the alien, pretending to be Evolto's ally while creating a specialized Best Match combination that could defeat the alien. He reveals his intentions to Sento when he thought Evolto had been defeated, but Evolto recovered and fatally wounds Shinobu. Shinobu lives long enough to give Sento his data to finalize the Cross-Z Build Form and apologize for hurting him. He comes back to life and like his son, he works as a scientist in the Japan Institute of Advanced Matter Physics in the new world. In Build New World: Kamen Rider Grease he created a copy of the Build Driver, which was owned by the Japanese government before being stolen by Downfall. After Downfall is defeated, he apologizes to Takumi for using him in the old world.

As the founder of Rider System, Shinobu possesses his own copy of the Build Driver and a set of Fullbottles to transform into another Kamen Rider Build. While having access to Best Match forms, Shinobu is capable of outmaneuvering the strongest of his opponents in one-on-one fights though he has difficulty fighting multiple opponents. He can also use another Fullbottle's power without transitioning, such as the use of Phoenix Fullbottle as an escape while still in Rabbit Tank form.

Kyōka Katsuragi
 is Takumi's mother and Shinobu's wife who was abducted from Hokuto and transformed by Faust into the first . She was purified by Build, with the extracted element purified to create the Lock Fullbottle, before she entrusted the flash drive that contains the information of the Project Build to Sento.

Prime ministers

Taizan Himuro
Despite the rivalries, Taizan wishes for Japan to reunite. Due to his poor health, he sent his son Gentoku to the unveiling of the Pandora Box, and retained his sanity as the only leader not affected by its radiation. Taizan suffered a heart attack during Faust's raid on Touto facility, and entrusted Gentoku as acting prime minister, unaware that Gentoku is high-ranking Faust-member Night Rogue. The Touto government was then compromised until Sento and Ryuga defeated Night Rogue, exposing his identity to Taizan who then orders his son to be taken into custody. Sōichi later poisoned Taizan which once again gives Gentoku emergency power to rule Touto. Taizan eventually recovered through Misora's power and exiled Gentoku while looking for a way to end the war with the least bloodshed. Taizan believes there is still good in Gentoku and vows to return his son.

As Namba and Stalk enact their plan to bring humanity into chaos, Taizan is kidnapped by Gentoku so Stalk can force Sento into reviving the original Project Build. Gentoku was already planning to save his father, working with the Kamen Riders against Evolto, but the plan backfires and Evolto transforms into Kamen Rider Evol. Taizan becomes the first victim of Evolto, sacrificing his life to save Gentoku from the alien. This act allows Gentoku to fully revert to his true self.

Yoshiko Tajimi
The Skywall Disaster rendered most of the farmland infertile with the resulting economic collapse forcing many citizens to take their children out of school. Tajimi's personality was affected by radiation from the Pandora Box, and she secretly directed government funds from social welfare to the military. The machinations of Sōichi, Namba and Gentoku cause war between the other two countries to take the Pandora Box by force, and she declares war on Touto. Her ruthless behavior during the invasion disgusts Kazumi as he threatens her to stop targeting innocent civilians.

During Touto's fight against Hokuto, Tajimi acts on Sōichi's advice to station her entire military on Touto's border to invade if Grease was defeated. But Tajimi realized she had been manipulated into leaving her nation vulnerable to Seito, which invade and take her into custody. She is later brainwashed by Evolto, transforming her into the  before being defeated and freed by Kamen Rider Build's Genius Form. This purified Tajimi's mind leaving her horrified and remorseful over everything she had done while being the only surviving prime minister.

Masakuni Midō
Midō expressed an interest in Tajimi's offer for alliance, but stood by while Hokuto and Touto weakened each other in warfare. When Hokuto lost to Touto, Midō sends Seito's military to invade Hokuto, taking over the country and capturing Tajimi. However, Midō is also a nervous man as shown by his reaction during the Touto-Seito proximity match.

After losing the fight against Touto, Midō keeps his agreement with Touto while falling out with Namba, resulting in his death by Evolto. The alien then had Namba assume Midō's identity to use the country for Namba Heavy Industries' operations and his future plots. Evolto later poses as Midō during his endgame plan and places his kinsmen into governor positions.

Vernage
 is the former queen of Mars who survived the destruction of her civilization at the cost of her physical form. She managed to seal Evolto along with his Evol-Trigger into the Pandora Box, while separating his Evol-Driver to prevent him from using it inside the box to free himself. When the artefacts were returned to Earth, her spirit was preserved in a bracelet which latched onto a young Misora. Ten years later, Vernage's consciousness slowly awakened and occasionally rescued the Kamen Riders from Namba's forces.

As her spirit resided within Misora's bracelet, she provided the young girl with the ability to purify Nebula Gas. The process caused Vernage's memories of her civilization's destruction to play within Misora's mind. Although presented as a powerful entity, she pointed out that her life force is diminishing. Vernage left Misora's body to restore girl's humanity while she was transformed into CD Lost Smash, and transferred herself into Ryuga to counteract the psychological effects from the trace remnants of Evolto's genes. Vernage passed away after Evolto's death, having fulfilled her goals.

Spin-off exclusive characters

Kaisei Mogami
 is the main antagonist of Kamen Rider Heisei Generations Final: Build & Ex-Aid with Legend Rider. Ten years earlier, while researching parallel universes, he found the Bugster Virus at the Skywall and concluded that the virus is from a parallel universe. He wanted to create the interdimensional gateway , but couldn't get funding so he moved to Namba Heavy Industries to continue his research. With Takumi's help, he developed both the Kaiser system and the Enigma which allowed him to make contact with the prime universe version of himself who is a Foundation X scientist. However, he lost the left side of his body due to an Enigma accident, caused by Takumi who opposed his ultimate goal. He resurfaces to cause the fusion and destruction of the two universes with the Enigma, to fuse with his counterpart and form a single immortal entity to become the ruler of all the universes. The two Mogamis form an alliance as they employ Foundation X's version of the Guardians known as the  while creating the Nebula Bugster strain. Both Mogamis eventually fuse, but their plans are foiled before being defeated by Ex-Aid and Build, the latter fulfilling their scheme to merge their dimensions months later while defeating Evolto.

Mogami is able to transform into the blue-colored , while his counterpart transforms into the red-colored . Utsumi managed to acquire the Kaiser System blueprints after Mogami's death and perfected the technology, which he gave to Seito as the developed Hell Bros gear used by the Washio brothers.

Blood Tribe
 are a mysterious race of extraterrestrial origin who originated from  before it was destroyed by their ruler Killbus. Led by Killbus's younger brother Evolto, the four surviving Blood members caused the downfall of the Martian civilization and many other planets before possessing the four astronauts sent to explore Mars.

Kengo Inō
 is Evolto's second-in-command who served as advisor to Seito Prime Minister Midō and influenced Sento meeting Ryuga, later becoming governor of Touto by the events of Kamen Rider Build the Movie: Be the One, after the Japanese civil war had ended. He then leads a mutiny against Evolto to carry out the Blood Tribe's initial plan to destroy Earth, Inō using the Tokyo populace's anti-Kamen Rider sentiment to hypnotize them into hunting down Sento with an infected Ryuga made into his personal agent. Once acquiring the Hazard Trigger to enable his transformation into Kamen Rider Blood, Inō later acquires the Pandora Box to proceed to travel down to Earth's core and destroy the planet from the inside-out. But he is destroyed by Kamen Rider Cross-Z Build.

Possessing the Cobra Lost Fullbottle, Inō uses it with Ryuga's Build Driver and Great Cross-Z Dragon, combined with Sento's Hazard Trigger to transform into . The form initially requires him to absorb nearby Blood Tribesmen, including Ryuga for possessing Evolto's essence, before Build extracted the absorbed targets from his body.

Mitsuomi Gōbara
 is a member of Blood Tribe and a former advisor to Hokuto Prime Minister Tajimi, having orchestrated Kasumi Ogura's conversion into a Smash, before becoming the new governor of Seito. He can transform into  using the  Lost Fullbottle. He was defeated by Kamen Rider Grease after initially defeating him in their first encounter.

Ryōka Saiga
 is a female member of Blood Tribe and a former aide to Touto Prime Minister Himuro before becoming the new governor of Hokuto. She can transform into  using the  Lost Fullbottle. She is defeated by Kamen Rider Rogue after initially defeating him in their second encounter.

Killbus
 is the older brother of Evolto and the Build New World: Kamen Rider Cross-Z, a suicidal hedonist who ruled Planet Blood before destroying it as part of his plan to use the Pandora Box to destroy the entire universe along with himself. He is later defeated by Ryūga in the Cross-Z Evol form.

By inserting the  loaded with the  Fullbottle into Sento's Build Driver, Killbus transforms into . Killbus transformed into Build before adopting his personal Rider namesake.

While assuming the forms of Sento Kiryu and Satoshi Kakizaki, he is portrayed by Atsuhiro Inukai and Gaku Shindo, respectively.

Satoshi Kakizaki
 is a famous dancer whose form was copied by Killbus. While Killbus in public, Killbus was heavily mistaken for the dancer himself, leading the media to think that "Satoshi Kakizaki" had gone crazy. After Killbus' death, the current status of Kakizaki's public image was restored to normal.

Yui Mabuchi
 is a young elementary school teacher who is looking for Kamen Rider Cross-Z, because she has faint memories of what happened before Sento merged the two worlds, when she was captured by Faust and died as a result of their Lost Fullbottle experimentation. After Killbus began the process of destruction with the Pandora Box, she recovers all the memories of her alternate self and blames Ryūga and the other Kamen Riders for not saving her together with her students, who are still in comas due to the events of the old world where they were attacked by Faust's Guardians. After Killbus is defeated and her students recover with the power of the Genius Fullbottle, she forgives Ryūga and to others, helping him in the sale of Sento's experiments and starting a new relationship with him in the process.

Downfall
 is an international radical terrorist organization that appear as the antagonists of Build New World: Kamen Rider Grease. Its members are actually those who had been experimented by the Nebula Gas and ex-Faust members from the old world; all aiming to exploit the Rider System and achieve world domination. They hack Japan's Guardians and Hard Guardians to use the androids as their weapons.

Keiji Uraga
 is the leader of Downfall known for his face who is a mad scientist captivated by technological advancement driven by war. Like Yui Mabuchi, he has burn marks and his memories of the old world because he was a Lost Fullbottle test subject. He was originally one of Faust's scientists who studied the Last Pandora Panel White alongside Shinobu Katsuragi and Evolto, but died as a result of their Lost Fullbottle experimentation. He determined to obtain the Last Pandora Panel White and dominate the new world as revenge for the old world that did not acknowledge his brilliance as a scientist, and he found , which is more powerful than Nebula Gas, before creating the Phantom Crushers using the liquid. He takes Shinobu's Build Driver and Sento's Hazard Trigger to become his own Build, which he calls , to confront the Sawatari farmers. He is later defeated by Kazumi in the Grease Perfect Kingdom form.

Kamen Rider Metal Build resembles Kamen Rider Build's Hazard form but with two black Tank-shaped eyes. He transforms into Metal Build using a pair of  Fullbottles. Aside from retaining Build Hazard's abilities, his use of a similar Fullbottle pair negates the Hazard Trigger's side-effects. After he is weakened by Grease Blizzard, Metal Build absorbed the Last Pandora Panel White and merged with a Phantom Crusher to become ; equipping him with the Phantom Crusher's armor.

Simon Marcus
 is a high-ranking official of the Alliance of Nations who seeks to dominate the world in collaboration with Downfall. Like other Downfall members, he also transforms into a Phantom Crusher. He is later shot dead by Uraga, who no longer needs him.

References

External links
Cast on TV Asahi

Build
, Kamen Rider Build
, Kamen Rider Build